Studio Vista was a British publishing company founded in 1961 that specialised in leisure and design topics. In the 1960s, the firm published works by a number of authors that went on to be noted designers.

History
Studio Vista was founded by Cecil Harmsworth King and it was then purchased by the Rev. Timothy Beaumont, later Baron Beaumont of Whitley, with funding from Beaumont's fortune. In 1961 David Mark Herbert joined the firm, becoming its editorial director and then chief executive. After Beaumont entered politics, he sold his publishing interests and Studio Vista was bought by the American firm Collier Macmillan in 1968. In 1969, the publisher Frances Lincoln joined the firm as an editorial assistant, staying for six years and rising to the position of managing editor. In 1975, Frances Lincoln led a strike at the firm after the new owners threatened to make 40 people redundant.

In the late 1950s and early 1960s some of Studio Vista's titles (such as William Klein's 1959 photo essay on Rome) and series (such as the Vista Travel guides and The Pocket Poets) were published under the publisher names of "Vista Books" and "Edward Hulton".

Books
Among the notable books published by the firm were The Nature of Design by the furniture designer David Pye (1964) and Graphics Handbook by the graphic designer Ken Garland (1966) (both in the Studio Paperbacks series edited by John Lewis), Norman Potter's What is a Designer: Education and Practice (1969), and Gillian Naylor's The Bauhaus (1968).  

The firm also published a number of books by the Romanian architect Serban Cantacuzino.

Book series
 Aquarium Paperbacks
 Blues Paperbacks (edited by Paul Oliver)
 Christie's South Kensington Collectors Series (in association with Christie's Contemporary Art)
 City Buildings
 Collectors' Blue Books
 Creative Sewing Series (in association with the Singer Company)
 Elements of Painting Series
 Facts of Print
 Field Sports Handbooks
 Gold Series
 Great Ages of World Architecture
 Great Drawings of the World
 Hadfield Anthologies
 Knowing and Doing
 Leaders of Modern Thought
 Movie Paperbacks (jointly published in the U.S. as Praeger Film Library by Praeger Publishing and by University of California Press)
 New Directions in Architecture
 Picturebacks (also referred to as: Studio Vista | Dutton Picturebacks) (published in the U.S. by E. P. Dutton)
 Planning and Cities
 Plan Your Home
 Pocket How-To-Do-Its (also known as: Pocket How To Do It) (jointly published in the U.S. by Watson-Guptill)
 The Pocket Poets
 Rockbooks
 Small Garden Library
 Studio Drawing Books
 Studio Handbooks
 Studio Paperbacks
 Vision + Value Series
 Vista Travel
 Visual History of Modern Britain

See also
 Diana Bloomfield
 Chris Marker

References

External links
"In praise of Studio Vista, Ken Garland and the good old days" by Rob Waller
Studio Vista at openlibrary.org
Serban Cantacuzino

Publishing companies based in London
Publishing companies established in 1961
1961 establishments in England